The American Orff-Schulwerk Association (AOSA) is an organization of American music educators dedicated to utilizing, advancing and preserving Orff-Schulwerk, a developmental learning approach to music education which was created by composer Carl Orff and his colleague Gunild Keetman.  It is an affiliate of the National Association for Music Education, the National Music Council, and the Orff-Schulwerk Forum in Salzburg, Austria. With approximately 4,500 members, it is one of the larger professional organizations for music educators in the United States.

AOSA offers several opportunities for professional development, including an annual national conference and the quarterly academic journal The Orff Echo. The organization has 96 local chapters throughout the United States which also provide workshops locally to their members. AOSA is also responsible for accrediting and organizing graduate level certifications in Orff-Schulwerk at numerous universities throughout the United States. A certificate in Orff-Schulwerk requires the successful completion of three graduate level courses in Orff-Schulwerk.

History
AOSA was founded in 1968 in Muncie, Indiana by ten music teachers. Its founding members were: 
Arnold E. Burkart
Isabel McNeill Carley
Norman Goldberg
Ruth Pollock Hamm
Joachim Matthesius
Elizabeth Nichols
Jacobeth Postl
Wilma Salzman
Jacques Schneider
William Wakeland

AOSA accredited graduate courses
The following is a list of universities that offer AOSA accredited graduate music studies in Orff-Schulwerk:

Anderson University (Indiana)
Appalachian State University
Arizona State University
Baker University
Baldwin Wallace University
Belmont University
Boston University
Bridgewater State University
California State University Los Angeles
DePaul University
Drake University
Eastman School of Music
Florida State University
George Mason University
Gordon College
Hofstra University
Illinois State University
Madonna University
Miami University
Samford University
Southern Methodist University

Stetson University
The Hartt School
Trinity University
University of Alaska
University of Arkansas
University of Central Arkansas
University of Georgia
University of Kentucky
University of Memphis
University of Mississippi
University of Missouri at St. Louis
University of Nebraska-Lincoln
University of Nevada, Las Vegas
University of Northern Colorado
University of Southern Maine
University of St. Thomas
Utah State University
VanderCook College of Music
Villanova University
Virginia Commonwealth University
West Chester University

Citations

Sources

External links
Official Website of AOSA

Music education organizations
Music organizations based in the United States
 
Organizations established in 1968
1968 establishments in the United States